Daniel Sebastian Jeleniewski (born 27 January 1983 in Lublin, Poland) is a motorcycle speedway rider from Poland. He was a member of Poland national team.

He gained his speedway licence in May 1999.

Honours 
Individual European Championship:
2007 - 15th place (1 points as track reserve)
2008 - 9th place in Semi-Final 1 (7 points)
 European Club Champions' Cup:
 2008 -  Slaný - Bronze medal (7 points)
Individual Polish Championship:
2005 - 11th place in Quarter-Final (5 points)
2006 - 8th place in Quarter-Final (8 points)
2007 - 4th place (9 points)
Individual U-21 Polish Championship:
2001 - th place ( points)
2002 - 14th place (2 points)
2003 - 9th place (8 points)
2004 - 12th place in Semi-Final (4 points)
Silver Helmet U-21:
2002 - 14th place in Semi-Final (3 points)
2003 - injury in Final - 8th place in Semi-Final (8 points)
2004 - 13th place (4 points)
Bronze Helmet U-19:
2000 - 13th place (3 points)
2001 - 10th place in Semi-Final (5 points)
2002 - 10th place (7 points)

See also 
 Poland national speedway team
 Speedway in Poland

References 

1983 births
Living people
Polish speedway riders
Sportspeople from Lublin
21st-century Polish people